The human gene UBR1 encodes the enzyme ubiquitin-protein ligase E3 component n-recognin 1.

The N-end rule pathway is one proteolytic pathway of the ubiquitin system. The recognition component of this pathway, encoded by this gene, binds to a destabilizing N-terminal residue of a substrate protein and participates in the formation of a substrate-linked multiubiquitin chain. This leads to the eventual degradation of the substrate protein. The protein described in this record has a RING-type zinc finger and a UBR-type zinc finger. Mutations in this gene have been associated with Johanson–Blizzard syndrome.

References

Further reading